The Browns were an American country and folk music vocal trio best known for their 1959 Grammy-nominated hit, "The Three Bells". The group, composed of Jim Ed Brown and his sisters Maxine and Bonnie, had a close, smooth harmony characteristic of the Nashville sound, though their music also combined elements of folk and pop. They disbanded in 1967 and were elected to the Country Music Hall of Fame in March 2015.

History
James Edward, older sister Maxine, and younger sister Bonnie Brown sang individually in Pine Bluff, Arkansas, until 1954, when Maxine and Jim Ed signed a record contract as a singing duo. They earned national recognition and a guest spot on Ernest Tubb's radio show for their self-penned song "Looking Back to See", which hit the top ten and stayed on the charts through the summer of 1954. The song would be a hit again nearly 20 years later for Buck Owens and Susan Raye in 1972.

They were joined in 1955 by then-recent high school graduate, 18-year-old Bonnie, and began performing on Louisiana Hayride in Shreveport, Louisiana. By the end of 1955, the trio was appearing on KWTO in Springfield, Missouri, and had another top ten hit with "Here Today and Gone Tomorrow", which got a boost by their appearances on ABC-TV's Ozark Jubilee, which Maxine Brown called "our real breakthrough." Jim Ed and Maxine had first appeared on the show as a duo in 1955. Producer Si Siman signed them with RCA Victor in 1956, and soon they had two major hits, "I Take the Chance" (a cover of a Louvin Brothers composition that showed the Browns' close harmony) and "I Heard the Bluebirds Sing". When Jim Ed was drafted in 1957, the group continued to record while he was on leave, and sister Norma filled in for him on tours, as did Billy Walker.

In 1959, The Browns scored their biggest hit when their folk-pop single "The Three Bells" reached No. 1 on the Billboard Hot 100 pop and country charts. The song also peaked at No. 10 on Billboard's Rhythm and Blues listing. Based on a song called "Les trois cloches", it was originally a hit in France for Édith Piaf.  It was merely a coincidence that the hit rendition by the Browns chronicles the life of a character named "Jimmy Brown". The recording sold over one million copies, "The Three Bells" by the Browns was nominated for both Record of the Year and the Best Group or Vocal Performance in the Grammy award categories in 1959. Their version of "Blue Christmas" reached No. 97 on the Billboard Hot 100 singles chart in December 1960.

The Browns appeared on The Ed Sullivan Show and American Bandstand, and followed up with "Scarlet Ribbons (For Her Hair)" and "The Old Lamplighter", recordings that also did well on both the pop and country charts. With an international following, they toured Europe extensively and saw further moderate success on the country music charts. In 1963, they joined the Grand Ole Opry.

Jim Ed began recording as a solo artist for RCA Victor in 1965, and these efforts quickly began overshadowing the trio's recordings. Maxine sang lead vocal on the group's final singles released in 1968, "Big Daddy" and "I Will Bring You Water," with Jim Ed only supplying background vocals. The trio officially disbanded that year and Maxine signed with Chart Records in 1969, resulting in a small hit with "Sugar Cane County".

In the 1980s, The Browns began performing occasionally in concert for the first time in nearly 20 years. In 2006, the trio performed "The Old Lamplighter" and "The Three Bells" for the PBS special, Country Pop Legends.

On June 11, 2015, Jim Ed Brown died from lung cancer at age 81. On July 16, 2016, Bonnie Brown also died from lung cancer at the age of 77. Maxine Brown died on January 21, 2019, at the age of 87 from complications of heart and kidney disease.

The Browns were honored with the "Lifetime Achievement Award" during the inaugural Arkansas Country Music Awards on June 3, 2018, alongside fellow Arkansas natives Johnny Cash, Glen Campbell, Ed Bruce, and Wayne Raney. The event was held at the Center for Performing Arts at the University of Arkansas at Little Rock.

Discography

Albums

Singles

 AAlso peaked at #35 on Adult Contemporary charts.

Notes

References

External links
[ The Browns at Allmusic.com]
The Browns at CMT.com
Jim Ed Brown's artist profile at Countrypolitian.com
Maxine Brown's Website - dead link

1954 establishments in Arkansas
1968 disestablishments in Arkansas
Musical groups from Arkansas
American country music groups
Country Music Hall of Fame inductees
Grand Ole Opry members
Musical groups established in 1954
Musical groups disestablished in 1968
RCA Victor artists
Sibling musical trios
American vocal groups
American musical trios